The Lakes of the Clouds are a set of tarns located at the  col between Mount Monroe and Mount Washington in the White Mountains of the U.S. state of New Hampshire. The lakes form the source of the Ammonoosuc River, a tributary of the Connecticut River.  They are recorded by the Geographic Names Information System as the highest elevation lakes in the United States east of South Dakota.

The Lakes of the Clouds Hut, a rental hut and lodge for hikers operated by the Appalachian Mountain Club, is adjacent to the lakes, facing west. Lakes of the Clouds may be reached by hiking from Marshfield Station, on the Mount Washington Cog Railway, via the Ammonoosuc Ravine Trail (in approximately four hours). The area is also traversed by the Crawford Path (part of the Appalachian Trail) and the Dry River Trail.

See also

List of lakes of New Hampshire
Presidential Range

References

External links
Lakes of the Clouds on TopoQuest

Lakes of Coös County, New Hampshire
Mount Washington (New Hampshire)
Lakes of New Hampshire